Following is a list of the heaviest bells known to have been cast, and the period of time during which they held that title.

Heaviest functioning bell in the world 
The title of heaviest functioning bell in the world has been held chronologically by:

The Great Bell of Dhammazedi 

At approximately 300 tons, the Great Bell of Dhammazedi is the largest bell to have existed in recorded history. Cast in 1484 by King Dhammazedi of Mon, this bell was located at the Shwedagon Pagoda in Rangoon, Burma (now Yangon, Myanmar). The bell was said to be twelve cubits (6.276 m) high and eight cubits (4.184 m) wide. Click here to see a drawing of the bell as it appeared while still at the Shwedagon Pagoda.

The Great Bell of Dhammazedi remained at the Shwedagon Pagoda as the heaviest functioning bell in the world until 1602. That year, Portuguese warlord and mercenary Philip de Brito removed it and attempted to carry it by a specially constructed raft down the Yangon River to his stronghold of Thanlyin (later known as Syriam). However, the ship carrying the bell sank at the confluence of the Yangon and Bago rivers. Numerous attempts have been made to locate and recover the bell, thus far without success.

So while the Great Bell of Dhammazedi might indeed be the heaviest bell in the world, it must be disqualified from consideration as such, until it has been recovered and restored to a functional status.

The Chion-in Temple Bell 
Cast in 1633, the 74-ton Chion-in Temple Bell, located in Kyoto, Japan, held the title of heaviest functioning bell in the world until 1810.

From March 1839 until March 1896, the Mingun Bell was not functional due to the fact that it was not hanging freely from its shackles. During this period, the Chion-in Temple Bell regained its former title.

The Mingun Bell 

Cast in 1808, the 90-ton Mingun Bell in Mingun, Sagaing Division, Burma became the heaviest functioning bell in the world from its suspension in 1810 until 23 March 1839. On that date, it was knocked off its supports by a large earthquake. Click here to see a photograph of the Mingun Bell as it appeared in the late 1800s.

The Mingun Bell was resuspended in March 1896 by a team of men from the Irrawaddy Flotilla Company. The Mingun Bell was again the world's heaviest functioning bell from its resuspension in 1896 until 1902.

The Mingun Bell regained its status as the heaviest functioning bell in the world in 1942.

The Shitennō-ji Temple Bell 
In 1902, the newly-cast 114-ton Shitennō-ji Temple Bell was hung in Osaka, Japan. The Shitennō-ji Temple Bell reigned as the heaviest functioning bell in the world from that year until 1942, when it was melted down for its metal to assist with the then-ongoing World War II effort.

The Bell of Good Luck 
Cast on New Year's Eve 2000, the Bell of Good Luck is located in the Foquan Temple in Pingdingshan, Henan, China. The bell weighs 116 metric tons (255,736 lbs.) and it is 810.8 cm (318 in) in height and 511.8 cm (201 in) in diameter. The Bell of Good Luck has therefore claimed the title of heaviest functioning bell in the world since its construction in 2000, up to the present date.

The Tsar Bell 

The 216-ton Russian Tsar Bell (also known as the Tsar Kolokol III) on display on the grounds of the Moscow Kremlin is the heaviest bell known to exist in the world today. However, a very large piece broke off from the Tsar Bell during a fire which engulfed the tower the bell was intended to be hung in, so this irreparably damaged bell has never been suspended or rung. The Tsar Bell cannot be considered as the heaviest functioning bell in the world due to its inability to serve as a percussion instrument. Rather, it may be considered to be the largest bell, or at least the largest bell-shaped sculpture in the world.

Existing bells 
Bells weighing 50,000 lbs (25 short tons) or more:

Destroyed or lost bells 
Bells weighing 50,000 lbs (25 short tons) or more, no longer in existence (lost or destroyed):

Gallery

See also 
American Bell Association International
Bellfounding
Campanology
Carillon
Russian Orthodox bell ringing

References

External links 
Blagovest Russian Church Bells:A Select List of Russian Bells Weighing 36,100 Pounds or More
Guild of Carillonneurs in North America
Russian Orthodox leader blesses new church bells at holy site

 List of heaviest Bells
Burmese musical instruments
Chinese musical instruments
German musical instruments
Japanese musical instruments
Russian musical instruments
Heaviest or most massive things